Frederick Olen Mercer (March 11, 1901 – April 3, 1966) was a United States district judge of the United States District Court for the Southern District of Illinois.

Education and career

Born in Vermont, Illinois, Mercer received a Bachelor of Laws from the University of Illinois College of Law in 1924. He was an assistant state's attorney of Fulton County, Illinois from 1924 to 1926. He was a county judge of Fulton County from 1926 to 1934. He was in private practice in Lewistown, Illinois from 1934 to 1940. He was in private practice in Canton, Illinois from 1940 to 1956.

Federal judicial service

Mercer was nominated by President Dwight D. Eisenhower on May 17, 1956, to a seat on the United States District Court for the Southern District of Illinois vacated by Judge J. Leroy Adair. He was confirmed by the United States Senate on June 13, 1956, and received his commission on June 19, 1956. He served as Chief Judge from 1958 to 1966. Mercer served in that capacity until his death on April 3, 1966.

References

Sources
 

1901 births
1966 deaths
Illinois state court judges
Judges of the United States District Court for the Southern District of Illinois
United States district court judges appointed by Dwight D. Eisenhower
20th-century American judges
20th-century American lawyers
People from Vermont, Illinois
University of Illinois College of Law alumni